Yedi Evlat İki Damat is a 1973 Turkish comedy-drama film, directed by Halit Refiğ and starring Cüneyt Gökçer, Perihan Savas, and Mesut Engin.

Cast 
 Cüneyt Gökçer - Hüsnü
 Perihan Savaş - Perihan
  - Tugrul 
  - Neslihan
  - Sedat

References

External links
Yedi Evlat İki Damat at the Internet Movie Database

1973 films
Turkish comedy-drama films
Films about families
Film remakes
1973 comedy-drama films
Films directed by Halit Refiğ